Hillsboro High School is a public secondary school in Hillsboro, Kansas, United States.  It is one of three schools operated by Hillsboro USD 410 school district, and is the sole public high school for the communities of Hillsboro, Lehigh, Durham, and nearby rural areas of Marion County.

History
In 1961, Reimer Stadium was built on the south side of Tabor College campus and named after former athletic director Del Reimer.  In 2008, the old stadium was demolished then replaced by Joel Wiens Stadium in 2009, which was a joint venture between Tabor College and Hillsboro USD 410.  The new 3,000-seat stadium includes new artificial football and soccer turf, synthetic track and a throwing area for field events, new bleachers on the home side, a new press box, and new concession stand and restroom facilities.  The team locker rooms and athletic offices were also constructed at the north end of the stadium at college expense.

Academics
The high school is a member of T.E.E.N., a shared video teaching network, started in 1993, between five area high schools.

Varsity sports

Notable people
 Theodore Schellenberg (1903-1970), archivist and archival theorist.

See also
 Joel Wiens Stadium
 List of high schools in Kansas
 List of unified school districts in Kansas

References

External links
 Official website, school district
 USD 410 School District Boundary Map, KDOT
 Hillsboro City Map, KDOT

Public high schools in Kansas
Schools in Marion County, Kansas